The Harare Tribune is an online daily newspaper published in Zimbabwe. It is based in Harare and has a staff of 16.

Background 
The Tribune is among a number of online newspapers that have come to the fore since the ZANU-PF government waged wars against the independent media around 2000.

See also
Zimbabwe Metro

Free daily newspapers
Internet properties established in 2001
Newspapers published in Zimbabwe
African news websites
Publications established in 2001
2001 establishments in Zimbabwe
Mass media in Harare